Fürstenberg-Taikowitz was a cadet branch of the princely House of Fürstenberg, originally from Swabia in present-day Baden-Württemberg, Germany. It emerged in 1759 as a partition of the Austrian Fürstenberg-Weitra line. The landgraves resided at Taikowitz Castle in southern Moravia, in the present-day Czech Republic.

Langraves of Fürstenberg-Taikowitz in Moravia 
 Friedrich Joseph Maximilian Augustus (1759-1814)
 Joseph Friedrich Franz de Paula Vincenz (1777-1840)
 Friedrich Michael Johann Joseph (1793-1866), the last landgrave of this line and official guardian of Bertha von Suttner

Properties 

Fürstenberg (princely family)
Counties of the Holy Roman Empire
Moravian nobility
Czech people of Austrian descent

References